Isabel Richer (born June 14, 1966) is a Canadian film and television actress from Quebec.

Career 
Richer's television roles have included Les Invincibles, Les Soeurs Elliot, Jasmine (1996) and Trauma, and her films have included Eldorado, Babine, Battle of the Brave (Nouvelle-France), The Pig's Law (La Loi du cochon), The Countess of Baton Rouge, The 3 L'il Pigs (Les 3 p'tits cochons), Audition (L'Audition), The Child Prodigy (L'Enfant prodige), Without Her (Sans elle), Ésimésac and The 3 L'il Pigs 2 (Les 3 p'tits cochons 2).

She was a Genie Award nominee for Best Actress at the 16th Genie Awards for her performance in Eldorado, and for Best Supporting Actress at the 30th Genie Awards for her performance in Babine.

Personal life 
She was formerly married to actor and film director Luc Picard, until they announced their split in 2013. Their son Henri Picard is an actor.

Filmography

Film

Television

References

External links

1966 births
Canadian television actresses
Canadian film actresses
Actresses from Quebec
French Quebecers
Living people